Germantown is a ghost town in Smith County, Kansas, United States.  The town is deserted, and currently only a cemetery remains.

History
Germantown was issued a post office in 1871. The post office was discontinued in 1893.

References

Former populated places in Smith County, Kansas
Former populated places in Kansas